Jan van Staa (born 27 May 1955) is a retired Dutch football midfielder and later manager.

References

1955 births
Living people
Dutch footballers
FC Utrecht players
Heracles Almelo players
Eredivisie players
Association football midfielders
Dutch football managers
Heracles Almelo managers
Eredivisie managers
Go Ahead Eagles managers
FC Twente managers